Stockbridge may refer to:

Places

United Kingdom 
 Stockbridge, Edinburgh, a suburb of Edinburgh, Scotland
 Stockbridge, Hampshire
 Stockbridge, West Sussex
 Stockbridge Anticline, one of a series of parallel east–west trending folds in the Cretaceous chalk of Hampshire
 Stockbridge Village, Liverpool
 Stockbridge (UK Parliament constituency)

United States 
 Stockbridge, Georgia
 Stockbridge, Massachusetts
 Stockbridge, Michigan
 Stockbridge Township, Michigan
 Stockbridge, New York
 Stockbridge, Vermont
 Stockbridge, Wisconsin
 Stockbridge (town), Wisconsin
 Stockbridge Bowl, artificially impounded body of water north of Stockbridge, Massachusetts
 Stockbridge Falls, a waterfall located on Oneida Creek southwest of Munnsville, New York

Structures
 Stockbridge Casino, a historic building in Stockbridge, Massachusetts
 Stockbridge House, historic building in Colorado Springs, Colorado, a.k.a. Amarillo Motel
 Stockbridge High School, a high school in Stockbridge, Georgia, Henry County School District
 Stockbridge Indian Cemetery, a cemetery north of Stockbridge, Wisconsin
 Stockbridge public library, Edinburgh
 Stockbridge Racecourse, a horse racing venue in Hampshire, England which closed in 1898
 Stockbridge School, a "progressive" co-educational boarding school for adolescents near Stockbridge, Massachusetts, 1948–1976 
 Stockbridge School of Agriculture, at the University of Massachusetts Amherst
 Stockbridge War Memorial, a First World War memorial in the town of Stockbridge in Hampshire in southern England

People
 Francis B. Stockbridge (1826–1894), U.S. Senator from Michigan
 Levi Stockbridge (1820–1904), farmer and scientist from Hadley, Massachusetts
 Nellie Stockbridge (1860s–1965), early Idaho frontier mining district photographer
 Richard Stockbridge, distinguished professor of Mathematics at the University of Wisconsin-Milwaukee
 Robert Stockbridge, a fictional character TV show Upstairs, Downstairs
 Sara Stockbridge (born 1966), English model, actress, and author
 William Stockbridge (1782–1850), American merchant and ship owner

Other uses
 Stockbridge damper, a device for suppressing wind-induced vibration on power lines
 Stockbridge Indians, a Native American tribe
 Stockbridge Mission Station, Eagletown, Oklahoma
 Stockbridge Capital Group, a private-equity estate investment company based in San Francisco

See also
 Sockbridge
 Stocksbridge